Dil Vil Pyar Vyar is a 2002 Indian Hindi language romantic musical film featuring an ensemble cast led by R. Madhavan, Jimmy Shergill, and Sanjay Suri. The film was inspired by the songs of music composer R. D. Burman and won positive reviews upon release in October 2002.

Plot 
The first love story is about love getting a second chance. Devdarshan Suri alias Dev (Sanjay Suri) is a widower, his wife Payal (Dipannita Sharma) dies soon after their honeymoon. He moves to Mumbai from Pune with his sister Rachna (Bhavna Pani). Here he meets Gauri (Sonali Kulkarni), who lives with her psychosomatically ill brother Gaurav (Rakesh Bapat).

Though they fall in love, the shadow of Gaurav's illness is always between them. And then Rachna falls in love with Gaurav: The second love story.

The third story is one of how love can be swallowed by ego, pride and insecurity. Krish Kumar (Madhavan) and Raksha (Namrata Shirodkar) are happily married. Both are aspiring singers and want to become stars. Though Krish is more ambitious than Raksha, it is Raksha who succeeds first and becomes a rage. Their marriage totters.

The fourth love story is that of Hrithik Mittal (Jimmy Shergill) and Jojo (Hrishitaa Bhatt). Even though Hrithik is a multi-millionaire and both the families want them married, Jojo refuses to marry him until he gets a job and becomes independent of his father.

Cast 

R. Madhavan as Krish Kumar
Hrishita Bhatt as Jojo
Rakesh Bapat as Gaurav
Jimmy Shergill as Hrithik Mittal
Sanjay Suri as Devdarshan “Dev” Suri
Namrata Shirodkar as Raksha Krish Kumar
Sonali Kulkarni as Gauri Shahapukar
Bhavna Pani as Rachna Suri, Dev’s sister
Asrani as Chandru
Tiku Talsania
Rita Bhaduri
Kamini Khanna
Mahabanoo Kotwal
Kiran Kumar as Gautam Mittal, Hrithik’s Father
Gulshan Grover as Dharam
Riya Sen (guest appearance)
Dipannita Sharma as Payal Suri, Dev’s wife, who’s no more (guest appearance)
Mini Mathur (guest appearance)
Tom Alter (special appearance)
Gufi Paintal (special appearance)
Joy Fernandes (special appearance)
Murli Sharma (special appearance)
Yashodhan Bal (special appearance)

Production 
Featuring an ensemble cast of actors, Dil Vil Pyar Vyar was revealed to be India's first retro-musical film and featured fourteen songs of the late music director, R. D. Burman, which formed the main crux of the plot. The producer, Vivek Vaswani, had earlier made Sar Aankhon Par as a tribute to actor Raj Kapoor and revealed that Dil Vil Pyar Vyar, would be followed by a third tribute film for actress Fearless Nadia. The film was shot in late 2001 across Mumbai, with R. Madhavan working on his portions from December 2001. Namrata Shirodkar replaced Mahima Chaudhry in the film's cast and was paired opposite Madhavan.

Release 
The film opened to positive reviews, with a critic from Rediff.com adding "it is the manner in which the filmmaker has infused these ordinary stories with passion and poignancy that sets Dil Vil Pyar Vyar apart from every other Hindi movie. Similarly, Planet Bollywood's critics noted that "the idea of Dil Vil Pyar Vyar has been implemented in a workable (and more importantly, watchable) manner and shows that talent and creativity still exists in our oft-inspired industry". Despite earning good reviews, the film did not perform well at the box office. This film was later dubbed and released into Tamil as Kettavarellam Padalam (2005).

Soundtrack 
This movie contains several re-arranged hit songs of R.D. Burman sung by singers like Kavita Krishnamurthy, Hariharan, Kumar Sanu,  Abhijeet Bhattacharya,  Alka Yagnik, Sadhna Sargam, Sunidhi Chauhan, Babul Supriyo, and Shaan. The re-arrangement was done by Babloo Chakravorty.

References

External links 

2000s Hindi-language films
2002 films
Films shot in the United Arab Emirates
Films directed by Anant Mahadevan